Vilaripalayam is a village in Valapady block in Salem District of Tamil Nadu State, India. It is located 33 km towards East from District headquarters Salem. 8 km from Valapady. 300 km from State capital Chennai. The total geographical area of village is 109.87 hectares. It has a total population of 1,151 peoples. There are about 338 houses in Vilaripalayam village. Valapady is nearest town to Vilaripalayam.

Geography and climate

Vilaripalayam has a tropical savanna climate (Köppen climate classification Aw). January and February are generally pleasant; the hot summer begins in March, with the year's highest temperatures during April. Pre-monsoon thunderstorms occur during April and May. The Southwest monsoon season lasts from June to September. The northeast monsoon occurs from October to December.

Demography

Tamil is the local language here.

Transport
 The nearest Bus Stand is located at Vazhapadi
 The nearest Railway stations are located at Vazhapadi, Ettapur Road.
 The nearest Airport is Salem Airport (India), about 56 km away.

Government Buildings 

Vilaripalayam has the following Government buildings.
 Government Secondary School (Up to 10th Standard) State Board Syllabus.
 Post Office.
 General Library
 Public Distribution Center

Temples in Vilaripalayam

 Muthumariyamman Temple 
 Lord Vinayagar Temple
 Lord Murugan Temple
 Lord Venkateshwara Temple

References

Villages in Salem district